Samira Rafaela (born 11 February 1989) is a Dutch politician of Democrats 66,  who has been serving as a Member of the European Parliament since 2019.

Political career
Rafaela was elected a Member of the European Parliament in the 2019 election, making her the first Dutch MEP with Afro-Caribbean roots. She has been a member of the Committee on International Trade (since 2019), the Committee on Women's Rights and Gender Equality (since 2019) and the Committee on Employment and Social Affairs (since 2021).

In addition to her committee assignments, Rafaela is part of the Parliament's delegations to the Euro-Latin American Parliamentary Assembly (EuroLat) and to the EU–Chile Joint Parliamentary Committee. She also co-chairs the European Parliament Anti-Racism and Diversity Intergroup and is a member of the European Parliament Intergroup on Artificial Intelligence and Digital and the European Parliament Intergroup on Disability.

References

1989 births
Living people
Democrats 66 MEPs
MEPs for the Netherlands 2019–2024
21st-century women MEPs for the Netherlands